Natalia Autric (born 29 December 1964) is a Spanish former swimmer who competed in the 1988 Summer Olympics.

References

1964 births
Living people
Spanish female swimmers
Spanish female backstroke swimmers
Olympic swimmers of Spain
Swimmers at the 1988 Summer Olympics
Mediterranean Games bronze medalists for Spain
Mediterranean Games medalists in swimming
Swimmers at the 1987 Mediterranean Games